Tribuloideae is a subfamily of the flowering plant family Zygophyllaceae.

Genera
 Balanites Delile
 Kallstroemia Scop.
 Kelleronia Schinz
 Neoluederitzia Schinz
 Sisyndite E.Mey. ex Sond.
 Tribulopis R.Br.
 Tribulus L.

References

 

 
Rosid subfamilies